Rathaspick is a place name and may refer to:

Places
Ireland
Rathaspick, County Laois, a townland
Rathaspick, County Laois (civil parish), a civil parish in the barony of Ballyadams
Rathaspick, County Westmeath, a townland
Rathaspick, County Westmeath (civil parish), a civil parish in the barony of Moygoish
Rathaspick, County Wexford, a townland
Rathaspick, County Wexford (civil parish), a civil parish in the barony of Forth